Familial Danish Dementia is a rare neurodegenerative disease that is mostly hereditary and resembles Alzheimer's. The condition was first reported in the Djursland peninsula in Denmark.

It is one of the two types of hereditary cerebral amyloid angiopathy alongside familial British dementia.

The disorder is histopathologically characterized by severe cerebral amyloid angiopathy with neurofibrillary tangle deposition in the limbic system and the neocortex. It is also neuropathologically characterized by diffuse atrophy of cerebellum, cranial nerves, and the spinal cord.

Symptoms and signs
Symptoms like cataracts, deafness, or ataxia appear before age 40.

Cerebellar ataxias appears around age 40.

There is also paranoid psychosis and dementia. Which both occur when the patient reaches their fifties. Although paranoid psychosis which typically develops after age 50.

Hearing impairments 
Hearing loss can appear around 40s to 50s. Hearing impairments can also appear as young as age 10 to 20. Severe hearing loss can occur around age 45.

Visual symptoms 
Vision problems are one the earliest symptoms of FDD with cataracts usually appear before age 30. The development of cataracts can appear as early as age 20. The median age for visual symptoms is 27.

Other symptoms 
Other symptoms include intention tremor, neurofibrillary tangles, spasticity, apathy, hyperorality, early dyscalculia, and stereotyped behavior.

Cerebral amyloid angiopathy in this disorder is severe. CAA is present in all regions of the central nervous system.

Causes 
The disorder is caused by autosomal mutations that are inherited.

Such as a mutation in the BRI2 gene on chromosome 13. It is also said to be caused by mutations in CHMP2B.

Mutations in cystatin c have also been suggested to be a cause of the disorder.

Diagnosis 

The condition resembles Begger syndrome and Refsum disease.

Prognosis 
Most people with this condition die when they reach their fifties or sixties, with the median age of death being 58. They usually die  due to complications from pneumonia, diarrhea, and strokes.

Epidemiology 
Familial Danish Dementia has been reported in a single family spanning three generations, with there being nine reported cases as of 2014. Males and females are equally affected by the disorder.

References 

Neurodegenerative disorders
Rare diseases